The 1990–91 Courage League National Division Two was the fourth full season of rugby union within the second tier of the English league system, currently known as the RFU Championship.

Rugby, the champions, were promoted to the Courage League National Division One for season 1991–92 along with the runner–up, London Irish. Headingley finished last and were relegated to Courage League National Division Three for season 1991–92 as were Richmond who finished one place above them.

Participating teams and locations

The number of teams in the division was increased by one to give a total of thirteen teams, with each team meeting the other teams once to give total of twelve matches each. Joining the ten teams who continued from last season were Bedford Blues who returned to Division Two after just one season in the top tier. Two teams, London Scottish and Wakefield were promoted from Division Three with London Scottish returning after just one season, and it was Wakefield's first season in this division. In 1990 the Gosforth club split into two clubs, one became Newcastle Gosforth and moved to Kingston Park, known then as the New Ground while Gosforth Rugby Club continued as an amateur side working in partnership with Northumbria University.

Table

Sponsorship
National Division Two is part of the Courage Clubs Championship and is sponsored by Courage Brewery

See also
 English rugby union system

References

N2
RFU Championship seasons